Helmut Thaler (born 22 January 1940) was an Austrian luger who competed from the late 1950s to the late 1960s. He won the silver medal in the men's doubles event at the 1964 Winter Olympics in Innsbruck and competed at the 1968 Winter Olympics.

Thaler also won two medals in the men's doubles event at the FIL World Luge Championships with a silver in 1960 and a bronze in 1961. He won a silver medal in the men's doubles event at the 1967 FIL European Luge Championships in Königssee, West Germany.

References

External links

 
 

1940 births
Living people
Austrian male lugers
Olympic lugers of Austria
Olympic silver medalists for Austria
Lugers at the 1964 Winter Olympics
Lugers at the 1968 Winter Olympics
Olympic medalists in luge
Medalists at the 1964 Winter Olympics